The 1941 Kansas City Monarchs baseball team represented the Kansas City Monarchs in the Negro American League (NAL) during the 1941 baseball season. The team compiled a 34–13 record and won the NAL pennant. 

The team featured three players who were later inducted into the Baseball Hall of Fame: center fielder Willard Brown; and pitchers Hilton Smith and Satchel Paige. 

The team's leading batters were:
 Willard Brown- .328 batting average, .555 slugging percentage, five home runs, 29 RBIs in 33 games
 Right fielder Ted Strong - .327 batting average, 602 slugging percentage, six home runs, 27 RBIs in 30 games

The team's leading pitchers were Hilton Smith (10–0, 1.53 ERA) and Satchel Paige (5–0, 2.35 ERA).

References

1941 in sports in Missouri
Negro league baseball seasons
Kansas City Monarchs